Timothy Michael Sullivan (6 January 1874 – 12 May 1949) was an Irish judge who served as Chief Justice of Ireland from 1936 to 1946, a Judge of the Supreme Court from 1924 to 1946, President of the High Court and a Judge of the High Court from 1924 to 1936.

He was born in Dublin in 1874, the third son of Timothy Daniel Sullivan, a prominent Home Rule Party MP and Lord Mayor of Dublin and his wife Catherine Healy. Through his sister Anne who married Dr. Thomas Higgins, he was the uncle of Kevin O'Higgins and great-uncle of another Chief Justice, Tom O'Higgins. His mother was a sister of  Timothy Michael Healy, the first Governor-General of the Irish Free State, and Sullivan in turn married their daughter Maeve. He was called to the Bar in 1895.

In 1913, Sullivan married his niece Maev Healy, daughter of his sister Erina Catherine Sullivan and her husband Timothy Michael Healy. Maev was an artist who painted the well-known portrait of her husband in his judicial robes. They had no children. His strongly nationalist background made him acceptable to the new Government of the Irish Free State as a member of the new judiciary and accordingly, in 1924, he was appointed President of the High Court; in 1936, on the death of Hugh Kennedy, he was appointed Chief Justice of Ireland and served until he reached retirement age in 1946.

His most notable judgment was the upholding by the Supreme Court in 1940 of the Constitutionality of the Offences Against the State (Amendment) Bill which allowed for indefinite detention of suspected IRA members. An apparently casual remark of Sullivan that he was giving judgment "for the majority" caused controversy and led to the Second Amendment of the Constitution of Ireland 1941 providing for a single judgment only in such cases. There was further controversy in the 1960s when an academic claimed that Sullivan had "packed" the Court in favour of the Government by persuading James Creed Meredith to step down in favour of Conor Maguire. The claim seems to be unfounded: Sullivan was a firm believer in judicial independence, and in any case, by 1940 any political sympathies he had were with the Opposition, not the Government.

His cousin Maurice Healy in his celebrated memoir "The Old Munster Circuit"  portrays  Timothy as a kindly, serious young man; Mr. Justice MacKenzie in his memoir "Lawful Occasions"  recalled the much older Sullivan, then Chief Justice, as  "an old-fashioned Irish gentleman, quiet living".

References

Chief justices of Ireland
Irish barristers
1874 births
1949 deaths
People from County Dublin
Presidents of the High Court (Ireland)
High Court judges (Ireland)
20th-century Irish judges
Alumni of King's Inns